Woodland Park was an unstaffed halt on the Dyserth branch line in North Wales.

The branch opened in 1869 for mineral traffic. In 1905 the LNWR began an innovative passenger service along the branch using steam Railmotors. The halt opened with the new service. It was situated in open country next to an overbridge carrying the road to Rhuddlan. Although the road is shown as "Meliden Road" on both maps of the era and modern maps the halt was named Rhuddlan Road. In the 1920s the substantial Woodland Park housing estate was built between the line and Prestatyn, utterly changing the character of the area. The halt was renamed Woodland Park in 1923 to reflect this new market.

Railmotors had retracting steps so conventional raised platforms were not needed. The halt was therefore built with a very short ground level platform. Initially it had no waiting facilities whatever, but by 1910 a cabin little larger than two phone booths was provided. 
 
The passenger service lasted only until 1930, when it was withdrawn by the LMS. The line remained open to serve a quarry at Dyserth until complete closure in 1973.

Since closure most of the former railway has been converted into a footpath. At the former station site visitors on this walk will notice the ground being higher up on the left when walking from Prestatyn towards Dyserth; this was probably where the platform would have been.

References

Sources

Further reading

Disused railway stations in Denbighshire
Prestatyn
Former London and North Western Railway stations
Railway stations in Great Britain opened in 1905
Railway stations in Great Britain closed in 1930